Zbigniew Ćwiąkalski (born March 9, 1950, in Łańcut) is a Polish politician, former Minister of Justice and Public Prosecutor General of Poland. He is a qualified lawyer, adwokat, and associate professor of law at the Jagiellonian University (Chair of Penal Law, Faculty of Law and Administration).

From 1972 to 1981 he was a member of the Polish United Workers' Party at Jagiellonian University. In 1981 he joined the Polish opposition (the Solidarity trade union).

In 1985 he was accused of being a secret collaborator of communist Służba Bezpieczeństwa, but there was no evidence of this.

From 2007 to 2009 he was the Minister of Justice in the government of Donald Tusk.

References

1950 births
Living people
People from Łańcut
Polish United Workers' Party members
Civic Platform politicians
20th-century Polish lawyers
Justice ministers of Poland
Jagiellonian University alumni
Academic staff of Jagiellonian University